The Diocese of Karlstad is a diocese of the Church of Sweden with its episcopal see in the city of Karlstad. It covers most of the provinces Värmland and Dalsland. Its current borders are from 1693.

List of Bishops 

Sveno Benedicti Elfdalius, 1647–1666
Andreas Birgeri Kilander, 1666–1673
Jonas Johannis Scarinius, 1673
Erlandus Svenonis Broman, 1673–1693
Benedictus Svenonis Camoenius, 1693–1704
Vacant (1704–1706)
Jonas Laurentii Arnell, 1706–1707
Vacant (1707–1709)
Torsten Rudeen, 1709–1717
Daniel Norlindh, 1717–1718
Ingemund Bröms, 1718–1722
Johannes Steuchius, 1723–1731
Magnus Petri Aurivillius, 1731–1740
Vacant (1740–1742)
Nils Lagerlöf, 1742–1769
Vacant (1769–1771)
Jöran Claes Schröder, 1771–1773
Vacant (1773–1775)
Daniel Henrik Herweghr, 1775–1787
Vacant (1787–1789)
Herman Schröderheim, 1789–1802
Vacant (1802–1805)
Olof Bjurbäck, 1805–1829
Johan Jacob Hedrén, 1830–1836
Carl Adolf Agardh, 1836–1859
Johan Anton Millen, 1859–1863
Anton Niklas Sundberg, 1864–1870
Vacant (1870–1872)
Claes Herman Rundgren, 1872–1906
Johan Alfred Eklund, 1906–1938
Arvid Runestam, 1938–1957
Gert Borgenstierna, 1957–1976
Sveninge Ingebrand, 1976–1986
Bengt Wadensjö, 1986–2002
Esbjörn Hagberg, 2002–2016
Sören Dalevi, 2016–present

References

 
Värmland
Dalsland
Karlstad
1581 establishments in Sweden
Religious organizations established in 1581